Ozone Gliders Limited is an  aircraft manufacturer based in Le Bar-sur-Loup, France, although it is registered in Edinburgh, Scotland. The company specializes in the design and manufacture of paragliders in the form of ready-to-fly aircraft.

The company CEO is Mike Cavanagh, while gliders are designed by hang gliding and paragliding world champion pilot Robbie Whittall.

The company produces a complete line of paragliders. In 2003 their line-up included the training Atom, tandem two-place Mac Daddy Bi, mountain descent Peak, competition Proton GT, sports Ozone Vibe and the intermediate Vulcan.

Whittall and Ozone have collaborated with other companies, such as Pilots Right Stuff in the design of their PRS Peak mountain descent glider.

Divisions

The company has four divisions:
Ozone Gliders Limited - manufactures paragliders
Ozone Power Limited - manufactures paramotor and speed flying wings
Ozone Kites Limited - manufactures parafoil kites for water, snow and land
Ozone Kitesurf Limited - manufactures inflatable kites for kitesurfing

Aircraft 

Summary of aircraft built by Ozone Gliders:

Ozone 6907
Ozone Addict
Ozone Alpina
Ozone Atom
Ozone Buzz
Ozone Cosmic Rider
Ozone Delta
Ozone Element
Ozone Enzo
Ozone FLX
Ozone Geo
Ozone Groundhog
Ozone Jomo
Ozone LM4
Ozone LM5
Ozone LM6
Ozone Mac Daddy Bi
Ozone Magnum
Ozone Mag2lite
Ozone Mantra
Ozone Mojo
Ozone Octane
Ozone Peak
Ozone Proton
Ozone Rush
Ozone Swift
Ozone Swiftmax
Ozone Trickster
Ozone Ultralite
Ozone Vibe
Ozone Vulcan
Ozone XXLite
Ozone Zeno

References

External links

Aircraft manufacturers of France
Paramotors
Paragliders
Companies based in Provence-Alpes-Côte d'Azur